Scoparone is a natural organic compound with the molecular formula C11H10O4.  It is found in the Chinese herb Artemisia scoparia and has been studied for its potential pharmacological properties including immunosuppression and vasorelaxation.

References 

Coumarins
Hydroxyquinol ethers